The RPG-2 (Russian: РПГ-2, Ручной противотанковый гранатомёт, Ruchnoy Protivotankovy Granatomyot; English: "hand-held antitank grenade launcher") is a man-portable, shoulder-fired anti-tank weapon that was designed in the Soviet Union. It was the first successful anti-tank weapon of its type, being a successor to the earlier and unsuccessful rocket-propelled grenade RPG-1.

The RPG-2 offered better range and armor penetration, making it useful against late and post-World War II tanks, in contrast to the RPG-1 that had only marginal utility. The basic design and layout was further upgraded to produce the ubiquitous RPG-7.

History
Studying German and US anti-tank rocket designs, in 1944 the Soviets began development of the RPG-1 with the goal of combining the best features of the German Panzerfaust single shot recoilless weapon with the US Bazooka rocket launcher.

Early testing revealed several minor problems, but, by the time these were being solved, 150 mm of penetration was no longer considered effective against modern tanks, even late-war designs like the Panther. The warhead was already straining the abilities of the cartridge and its range was already considered too low. Modifications to improve this began, but in 1947 the RPG-2 program began as a parallel project. Development of the RPG-2 was carried out by the GSKB-30 design bureau, originally part of the Commissariat for Munitions, but in the post-war period handed to the Ministry of Agriculture to help design farm equipment.

The main difference in performance between the two were due to size. The larger cartridge gave the PG-2 warhead slightly better practical range as well, about  against stationary targets.

The design of the PG-2 differed considerably from that of the PG-1 of the RPG-1. The rear section of the PG-1 consisted of a central tube holding the propelling charge, and a second tube around this carrying the fins. When the round was inserted into the launcher, the second tube was outside the launcher tube, requiring the front of the launcher to be free of any fittings. The PG-2 replaced the fins with small metal leaves attached to the inner tube, and eliminated the outer tube found on the PG-1. This allowed the entire propellant section to be inserted into the launcher, which in turn allowed the sights and trigger assembly to be mounted right at the front of the launcher. This slightly reduced the length compared to the RPG-1, made the entire assembly more robust, and allowed the use of conventional fore-and-aft sights.

The new design was such an improvement on the earlier design that development of the RPG-1 ended in 1948. The first production versions of the RPG-2 entered service with the Soviet Army's infantry squads in 1954. Although the RPG-2 could be operated by one man, standard military practice called for a two-man crew: a grenadier carrying a Stechkin APS, the launcher and a purpose-built backpack containing three grenades and an assistant armed with a rifle and carrying another three-grenade backpack.  

In 1957, the launcher was adapted to be able to mount the NSP-2 infrared (IR) night-sight system, which consisted of an IR spotlight and a detector, together weighing (with batteries) . The NSP-2 was usable out to  under good conditions. When fitted with the NSP-2, the launcher became known as the RPG-2N.

Widely distributed to allies of the Soviet Union, it was also produced under license by China, North Vietnam and North Korea. Used against the U.S. military in the Vietnam War, its Vietnamese variants were called the B40 (Ba Do Ka - "Bazooka 40mm") and B50. B50 was B40 using Chinese Type 50 HEAT warhead (Chinese version of PG-2).

Design

The RPG-2 anti tank grenade launcher is a simple 40 millimeter steel tube into which the PG-2 grenade is fitted. The tailboom of the grenade inserts into the launcher. The diameter of the PG-2 warhead is 80mm. The center section of the tube has a thin wooden covering to protect the user from the heat generated by the grenade launch. The wooden covering also makes using the weapon in extreme cold conditions easier.

The total length of the weapon with a grenade fitted was 120 centimeters (47 inches) and it weighed 4.48 kilograms (9.8 pounds). Only a simple iron sight was provided for aiming.

Only one type of grenade, the PG-2 high-explosive anti-tank (HEAT), was used in the RPG-2. The propellant, consisting of granulated powder was in a rolled cardboard case treated with wax that had to be attached to the grenade before loading. Once attached to the propellant charge, the grenade was inserted into the smooth-bore launcher from the front. A tab on the body of the grenade indexes in a notch cut in the tube so that the primer in the propelling charge aligns with the firing pin and hammer mechanism.

To fire the RPG-2, the grenadier cocked an external hammer with his thumb, aimed, and pulled the trigger to fire. Upon launch, six stabilizer fins unfolded from the grenade.

The weapon was accurate, depending on the soldier's experience, against stationary targets up to 150 meters and against moving targets at ranges of less than 100 meters. It had a muzzle velocity of 84 meters per second and could penetrate armor up to 180 millimeters (7.17 inches) thick.

Variants

 RPG-2N - First introduced in 1957, it's equipped with a NSP-2 night sight, connected to a battery man pack via cable.
 B40 - North Vietnamese clone of the RPG-2. Rear barrel guard is 50mm shorter than the RPG-2/Type 56.
 B50 - Enlarged version of the B40.
 Yasin
 Type 56 - Chinese clone of the RPG-2.
 P-27 - Czech version of the RPG-2.
 RPG-2 clones made by the Moro Islamic Liberation Front
 M57-Yugoslavian clone. Heavier than the standard RPG-2 and used different ammunition. Equipped with bipod and optical sight. Uses sand in the propellant system to add mass.

Users

Current users

 : Locally produced from 1958-1959
  Designated as the B-40 in Vietnamese service.
 
 
 
 : Used in small numbers, mainly by Thahan Phran.

Former users
 
 : Used Type 56s in small numbers.
 
 
 : Adopted and produce by the People's Liberation Army (PLA) as the Type 56 RPG; replaced by the newer Type 69 RPG.
 :P-27 clone
 
 
 
 
  Hungary
 
 
 
 
 
 : Type 56s were supplied by China during Independence War
 : Supposedly used RPG-2 secretly provided by Israel through Singaporean channel from pro-Palestinian guerrilla stock.
 :Ordered 2.600 P-27s from Czechoslovakia between 1952 and 1955 Also used RPG2
 
 
 
  - Several units in storage as of 2008.
 :Used by MACVSOG recon teams 
 :Adopted and produced as the M57

Non-state actors
  Abu Sayyaf  (Used RPG-2/B40s)
  Democratic Forces for the Liberation of Rwanda
  Farabundo Martí National Liberation Front
  Moro Islamic Liberation Front (RPG-2 clones)
  Moro National Liberation Front
  Mozambique Liberation Front
  NPA
  Taliban
  Ta'ang National Liberation Army
  Viet Cong
  National Democratic Alliance Army
  Kachin Independence Army
  United Wa State Army

References

External links
 Russian Weapons

Rocket-propelled grenade launchers of the Soviet Union
Military equipment introduced in the 1950s